Loxicha Zapotec (Western Pochutla Zapotec) is a Zapotec language of Oaxaca, Mexico. It is one of the most populous varieties of Zapotec, and the majority of speakers are monolingual.

Not all varieties of Zapotec from towns named "Loxicha" are part of Loxicha Zapotec. San Baltázar Loxicha Zapotec, which includes Santa Catarina Loxicha, is a distinct language.

Phonology

Vowels

Consonants 

/b, d/ can be realized as [β ð] when occurring intervocalically. /ɡ/ is realized as [ɣ] when occurring at the first syllable. /ɸʷ, s/ only occur in Spanish loanwords. /ŋ/ only marginally occurs and at the end of a syllable.

References

Zapotec languages